Chromosome 17 is one of the 23 pairs of chromosomes in humans. People normally have two copies of this chromosome. Chromosome 17 spans more than 84 million base pairs (the building material of DNA) and represents between 2.5 and 3% of the total DNA in cells.

Chromosome 17 contains the Homeobox B gene cluster.

Genes

Number of genes 
The following are some of the gene count estimates of human chromosome 17. Because researchers use different approaches to genome annotation their predictions of the number of genes on each chromosome varies (for technical details, see gene prediction). Among various projects, the collaborative consensus coding sequence project (CCDS) takes an extremely conservative strategy. So CCDS's gene number prediction represents a lower bound on the total number of human protein-coding genes.

Gene list 

The following is a partial list of genes on human chromosome 17. For complete list, see the link in the infobox on the right.

The following are some of the genes and their corresponding Cytogenetic location on chromosome 17:

p-arm

q-arm

Diseases and disorders

The following diseases are related to genes on chromosome 17:

 17q12 microdeletion syndrome
 Koolen–de Vries syndrome
 Alexander disease
 Andersen–Tawil syndrome
 Aneurysmal bone cyst
 Birt–Hogg–Dubé syndrome
 Bladder cancer
 Breast cancer
 Bruck syndrome
 Campomelic dysplasia
 Canavan disease
 Cerebroretinal microangiopathy with calcifications and cysts
 Charcot–Marie–Tooth disease
 Chronic lymphocytic leukaemia, tp53
 Corticobasal degeneration
 Cystinosis
 Depression
 Ehlers–Danlos syndrome
 Epidermodysplasia verruciformis
 Frontotemporal dementia and parkinsonism linked to chromosome 17
 Galactosemia
 Glycogen storage disease type II (Pompe disease)
 Hereditary neuropathy with liability to pressure palsies
 Howel–Evans syndrome
 Li–Fraumeni syndrome
 Maturity onset diabetes of the young type 5
 Miller–Dieker syndrome
 Multiple synostoses syndrome
 Neurofibromatosis type I
 Nonsyndromic deafness
 Obsessive–compulsive disorder
 Osteogenesis imperfecta
 Potocki–Lupski syndrome
 Proximal symphalangism
 Sanfilippo syndrome
 Smith–Magenis syndrome
 Usher syndrome
 Very long-chain acyl-coenzyme A dehydrogenase deficiency
 Von Gierke's syndrome

Cytogenetic band

References

 
 Gene Card Website https://www.genecards.org/cgi-bin/carddisp.pl?gene=SCN4A

External links

 
 

Chromosomes (human)